Caladenia hopperiana is a species of orchid endemic to the south-west of Western Australia. It has a single leaf and up to four creamy-yellow flowers with faint red markings.

Description
Caladenia hopperiana is a terrestrial, perennial, deciduous, herb with an underground tuber and which sometimes grows in clumps. The sepals and petals are linear to lance-shaped for about half their length then suddenly narrow to thread-like, densely glandular ends. The sides of the labellum have short, blunt, forward-facing, white to deep brown teeth, decreasing in size towards the front of the labellum. Flowering occurs from September to October.

Taxonomy and naming
Caladenia hopperiana was first described in 2001 by Andrew Brown and Garry Brockman from a specimen collected near Quindanning and the description was published in Nuytsia. The specific epithet (hopperiana) honours the Western Australian botanist, Stephen Hopper.

Distribution and habitat
This caladenia is only known from the Qunidanning district in the Jarrah Forest biogeographic region where it grows in woodland near creeks and swamps.

Conservation
Caladenia hopperiana is classified as "Threatened Flora (Declared Rare Flora — Extant)" by the Western Australian Government Department of Parks and Wildlife.

References

hopperiana
Orchids of Western Australia
Endemic orchids of Australia
Plants described in 2015
Endemic flora of Western Australia